Pithecopus megacephalus, also known as the large-headed leaf frog, is a species of frog in the subfamily Phyllomedusinae. It is endemic to Brazil and is only known from a few peaks in the Espinhaço Mountains in the state of Minas Gerais.

References

megacephalus
Amphibians of Brazil
Endemic fauna of Brazil
Taxa named by Alípio de Miranda-Ribeiro
Taxonomy articles created by Polbot